The official coat of arms of Grenada is a shield divided into four parts by a golden cross. In the centre of this cross is the Santa Maria, Columbus' flagship. A lion passant guardant on a red field is shown in the upper left and lower right sections of the shield, with a golden crescent moon out of which a lily grows in the upper right and lower left sections. Above the shield there is a golden helmet, topped with a garland of bougainvillea branches. Within the garland are seven red roses, which stand for the seven communities of Grenada (six parishes and the Southern Grenadines). Holding the shield on the dexter side is a nine-banded armadillo which stands before a corn stalk; on the sinister side is a Grenada dove, which stands before a banana plant. The base represents Mount St. Catherine with the Grand Etang Lake at the centre. A ribbon displays the national motto: "Ever conscious of God we aspire, build and advance as one people."

The coat of arms was adopted by the island nation in 1974 following independence.

Colonial badges 
In the colonial period, Grenada's first arms were in use between 1875 and 1903. These featured Black Grenadian workers operating a sugarcane mill, pulled by a pair of oxen. The motto in Latin reads hae tibi erunt artes, a quote from the Aeneid meaning "these shall be your arts."

A second badge was used between April 1903 and 1967, depicting a sailboat and the Latin motto Clarior e Tenebris ("[I shine] more brightly from the darkness").

References

External links
Coat of Arms of Grenada (official website of the government of Grenada)

National symbols of Grenada
Grenada
Grenada
Grenada
Grenada
Grenada
Grenada
Grenada
Grenada
Grenada
Grenada
Grenada